= Luqatah =

Luqatah according to the Hanafi school of Sunni school of Islamic jurisprudence (fiqh) is a treasure that is found by someone, whose owner is unknown, and this property is not included in the category of assets that can be owned, such as pagan harbi treasure (infidels who are at war with Islamic government).

For that reason, the thing about luqatah is that we really understand it accurately and are conditioned, because all things found have clear and bounded rules. While when in the middle of a trip that can be just for an afternoon walk, there is a possibility we will "find" something, can be in the form of money, jewelry, and others.

In the Hanafi School, in addition to the problem of goods, also discussed issues relating to child collection. That is, if found a child who ran away from his family, lost his family or abandoned by his family, so that his father'and mother is unknown. Cases like this by the Hanafi School are termed laqit.
